László Salacz (born in Kalocsa, Hungary on 21 May 1971) is a Hungarian lawyer and politician. He is a member of parliament in the National Assembly of Hungary (Országgyűlés) since May 2018. He is a member of the Hungarian Bar Association.

References 

Living people
People from Kalocsa
1971 births
21st-century Hungarian lawyers
21st-century Hungarian politicians
Members of the National Assembly of Hungary (2018–2022)
Members of the National Assembly of Hungary (2022–2026)